Giuseppe Colacicco (4 April 1904 – 28 August 1984) was an Italian boxer who competed in the 1924 Summer Olympics. In 1924 he was eliminated in the first round of the welterweight class after losing his fight to Edgar Christensen.

References

External links
Part 5 the boxing tournament

1904 births
1984 deaths
Welterweight boxers
Olympic boxers of Italy
Boxers at the 1924 Summer Olympics
Italian male boxers
20th-century Italian people